The 1985 Prize of Moscow News was the 20th edition of an international figure skating competition organized in Moscow, Soviet Union. It was held December 4–8, 1985. Medals were awarded in the disciplines of men's singles, ladies' singles, pair skating and ice dancing. Soviet skaters swept the men's podium, led by world champion Alexandre Fadeev. American Caryn Kadavy won the ladies' category ahead of Anna Kondrashova. Olympic bronze medalists Larisa Selezneva / Oleg Makarov took the pairs' title. The ice dancing event featured Olympic medalists Natalia Bestemianova / Andrei Bukin and Marina Klimova / Sergei Ponomarenko, who would take gold and silver respectively.

Men

Ladies

Pairs

Ice dancing

References

1985 in figure skating
Prize of Moscow News